Kévin Mickael Junior Gomis (born 20 January 1989) is a French former professional footballer who played as a central defender.

Football career
Born in Paris, Gomis started his professional career with En Avant de Guingamp, but only played officially with the reserves. In summer 2009 he signed a two-year contract at Portuguese club Associação Naval 1º de Maio, being joined by countryman manager Victor Zvunka the following year.

Gomis appeared in his first Primeira Liga match on 29 August 2009, playing the full 90 minutes in a 1–3 home loss against FC Porto. He finished his first season with 23 games (all starts), as the Figueira da Foz side ranked in a best-ever eighth position.

In late 2011, after his link to Naval expired, Gomis returned to his country and signed for three years with OGC Nice. He made his Ligue 1 debut on 6 August, coming on as a second half substitute in a 1–3 home defeat against Olympique Lyonnais.

Gomis joined Nottingham Forest in January 2014, on loan for the remainder of the campaign. He made his only appearance for the English on 8 March, starting and being booked in a 0–1 loss at Barnsley for the Football League Championship, being subsequently left out of the selection reckoning reportedly due to caretaker manager Gary Brazil's opinion that his attitude was unconstructive.

On 19 August 2016, Gomis signed for Scottish Premiership club Dundee on a one-year contract.

On 19 November 2018, he signed for Grand Quevilly FC, in 6th level in france. He would retire in 2020.

Club statistics

References

External links

1989 births
Living people
French sportspeople of Senegalese descent
Footballers from Paris
French footballers
Senegalese footballers
Association football defenders
Ligue 1 players
En Avant Guingamp players
OGC Nice players
Primeira Liga players
Associação Naval 1º de Maio players
English Football League players
Nottingham Forest F.C. players
Scottish Professional Football League players
Dundee F.C. players
French expatriate footballers
Senegalese expatriate footballers
Expatriate footballers in Portugal
Expatriate footballers in England
Expatriate footballers in Scotland
French expatriate sportspeople in Portugal
Senegalese expatriate sportspeople in Portugal
French expatriate sportspeople in England
Senegalese expatriate sportspeople in England
French sportspeople of Bissau-Guinean descent
Senegalese people of Bissau-Guinean descent